Markéta Jeriová (born June 10, 1976) is a Czech luger who competed from 1998 to 2006. Competing in two Winter Olympics, she earned her best finish of 19th in the women's singles event at Salt Lake City in 2002.

Jeriová crashed during the first run of the women's singles event at the 2006 Winter Olympics in Turin and did not finish. She walked away uninjured.

Jeriová's best finish at the FIL World Luge Championships was 20th in the women's singles event at Nagano in 2004.

References
 2002 luge women's singles results
 2006 luge women's singles results
 Aktuálně.cz profile 
 FIL-Luge profile
 The-sports.org profile
 USA Today February 14, 2006 article that included Jeriova's first run crash at the 2006 Winter Olympics in Turin

External links
 
 
 

1976 births
Living people
Czech female lugers
Olympic lugers of the Czech Republic
Lugers at the 2002 Winter Olympics
Lugers at the 2006 Winter Olympics